The Story of Nampoo is a 1984 Thai drama film directed by Euthana Mukdasanit. It is based on the book of the same name (known in Thai as ) by Suwanni Sukhontha. The film was selected as the Thai entry for the Best Foreign Language Film at the 57th Academy Awards, but was not accepted as a nominee.

Plot
The story focuses around Nampoo, the son of the writer Suwanni Sukhontha, and his struggles with drug addiction, which eventually lead to his death.

Cast
 Rewat Buddhinan
 Amphol Lumpoon as Nampoo
 Patravadi Sritrairat
 Wasamon Watharodom

See also
 List of submissions to the 57th Academy Awards for Best Foreign Language Film
 List of Thai submissions for the Academy Award for Best Foreign Language Film

References

External links
 

1984 films
1984 drama films
Thai drama films
Thai-language films
Films based on Thai novels
Thai national heritage films